Richard Mark Crossley (born 5 September 1970) is an English former professional footballer who played as a defender in the Football League for York City, in Hong Kong football for Michelotti and was on the books of Huddersfield Town without making a league appearance. Later he played in Hong Kong and China.

References

1970 births
Living people
Footballers from Huddersfield
English footballers
Association football defenders
Huddersfield Town A.F.C. players
York City F.C. players
English Football League players